Bhagavan is a term meaning the blessed or fortunate one in Hinduism.

Bhagavan (also spelt Bhagawan or Bhagwan) may also refer to:

Svayam Bhagavan, a philosophical concept in monotheistic Vaisnava traditions

People
Bhagavan Antle, American wildlife enthusiast, trainer, and businessperson
Bhagwan Dada (1913–2002), Indian actor and film director
Bhagwan Das (1869–1958), Indian theosophist
Bhagavan Das (yogi) (born 1945), American yoga teacher
Bhagwan Shree Rajneesh (1931–1990), also known as Osho, Indian mystic and spiritual teacher
Dada Bhagwan (1908–1988), Gujarati spiritual leader
Krishna Bhagavaan (born 1965), Indian actor
Sri Bhagavan (born 1949), Indian spiritual master and founder of Oneness University

Films
Bhagavan (1986 film), a Malayalam film
Bhagavan (2009 film), a Malayalam film
Bhagawan (2004 film), a Kannada action film